This is the electoral history of Newt Gingrich. Gingrich, a Republican, served as the 50th Speaker of the United States House of Representatives from 1995 until his resignation in November 1998. He represented Georgia's 6th congressional district as a Republican from 1979 until his resignation in January 1999. In 2012, Gingrich was a candidate for the Republican Party presidential nomination.

Georgia's 6th congressional district

1974 election

1976 election

1978 election

1980 election

1982 election

1984 election

1986 election

1988 election

1990 election

1992 election

1994 election

1996 election

1998 election

Speaker of the House of Representatives

1995 election

1997 election

United States President

2012

Notes

References

Gingrich, Newt
Newt Gingrich